Coleophora argenteonivea is a moth of the family Coleophoridae. It is found in southern France, Spain, Portugal and Sardinia.

The larvae feed on Centaurea pectinata and Cynara cardunculus. Before hibernation, the larvae creates two or three cases consisting of a single leaf fragment. After hibernation, a composite leaf case is made. The latter consists of 3-4 leaf fragments, is brown and about 15 mm long and bivalved. The mouth angle is about 45°. Larvae can be found from August to May.

References

argenteonivea
Moths described in 1907
Moths of Europe